Bunde railway station located in Bunde, the Netherlands. The station opened in 1862 on the Maastricht–Venlo railway.

Train services
The following train services by Arriva call at this station:
 Local stoptrein S2: Roermond–Sittard–Maastricht Randwyck

Bus services
 9

References

External links
NS website

Railway stations in Limburg (Netherlands)
Railway stations opened in 1862
Railway stations on the Staatslijn E
Meerssen
1862 establishments in the Netherlands
Railway stations in the Netherlands opened in the 19th century